East Otay Mesa is an as-yet undeveloped area in the South Bay region of unincorporated San Diego County, southern California.

It is located along the northern side of the U.S.-Mexico border, with plans for future developments, including an order crossing and business park. East Otay Mesa is immediately east of the Otay Mesa neighborhood of the city of San Diego, west of the San Ysidro Mountains, and north of the Centenario borough of Tijuana, Mexico.

The Otay Mesa East Port of Entry (also "Otay Mesa II"), a new planned border crossing, is to connect East Otay Mesa with Centenario, Tijuana, starting in 2023.

External links
"Otay Mesa East Port of Entry / State Route 11 Presidential Permit Application", 2007, SANDAG and California Department of Transportation District 11

References

Unincorporated communities in San Diego County, California
San Ysidro Mountains
South Bay (San Diego County)
Unincorporated communities in California